Little Polveir (1977–1999) was a race horse. He won the 1989 Grand National steeplechase ridden by Jimmy Frost, beating West Tip by seven lengths. The horse had previously finished ninth in 1986 and did not finish in 1987 and 1988 (where he fell at one after Valentine's Brook) while owned by Mike Shone, after which he was sold as a 12-year-old for 15,000gns in February 1989.

The track "Little Polveir" by the Sheffield-based band Monkey Swallows the Universe is named after the horse. After the track was written, the band signed to Loose Records, which coincidentally is owned by Tom Bridgewater, the son-in-law of Toby Balding, Little Polveir's trainer. Little Polveir died in 1999.

Grand National record

References

External links
 Video (YouTube) Little Polveir winning the 1989 Grand National

1977 racehorse births
1999 racehorse deaths
Thoroughbred family 1-r
Racehorses bred in the United Kingdom
Racehorses trained in Ireland
National Hunt racehorses
Grand National winners
Byerley Turk sire line